William Muir (1819–1905) was a Scottish Orientalist and colonial administrator.

William Muir may also refer to:

 William Muir (coach) (1895–1967), American football, basketball, and baseball coach
 William Muir (cricketer) (1907–1964), Australian cricketer
 Willie Muir (1877–?), Scottish footballer
 William Muir (divine) (1787–1869), Scottish minister, Moderator of the General Assembly of the Church of Scotland in 1838
 William H. Muir (1902–1964), American sculptor
 William Muir (writer) (born 1967), British writer

See also 
 Bill Muir (born 1942), former American football coach
 Billy MacKinnon (William Muir MacKinnon, 1852–1942), Scottish footballer
 W. H. M. Lowe (William Henry Muir Lowe, 1861–1944), British Army officer